Rytis is a Lithuanian masculine given name. Individuals with the name Rytis include:
Rytis Daukantas, Lithuanian architect and editorial cartoonist
Rytis Juknevičius (born 1993), Lithuanian basketball player
Rytis Leliūga (born 1987), Lithuanian footballer
Rytis Rimdeika (born 1966), Lithuanian medical doctor, scientist and professor
Rytis Mažulis (born 1961), Lithuanian composer
Rytis Sakalauskas (born 1987), Lithuanian track and field sprint athlete 
Rytis Vaišvila (born 1971), Lithuanian basketball player and coach
Rytis Zemkauskas (born 1969), Lithuanian journalist, writer, broadcaster and a film director

References

Lithuanian masculine given names